Marshall E. Christmann III is a former Republican member of the Kansas House of Representatives, representing the 113th District, which included Pratt and Stafford counties as well as portions of Barton, Rice and Pawnee counties.

Committee assignments 
Representative Christmann served on these legislative committees:
 Judiciary 
 Military, Veterans and Homeland Security
 Energy and Environment
 Vision 2020
 Health and Human Services
 Health and Human Services House/Senate Joint Committee

Legislative caucuses 
Representative Christmann served on these Legislative Caucuses:
 House Rural Caucus (Vice-Chairman)
 House Multiple Sclerosis Caucus (Vice-Chairman)

Legislative legacy

While in the House of Representatives Christmann negotiated to create a port authority in his district. Since the inception of the state in 1861 Kansas has only had four port authority's, of which only three still currently operate in the state. The Christmann negotiations secured a passing vote of 121 to 0 in the House and 40 to 0 in the Senate. The impact helped job growth in Christmann's district that was double the states percentage numbers during his tenure in the House.

Sponsored legislation
Representative Christmann's sponsored legislation consisted of several bills aimed at government accountability as well as government transparency reforms, these proposed laws included:
 HB 2438 – The Transparency and Accountability Act; an act providing for live audio and video broadcasts of legislative meetings to the public.
 HCR 6037 – A bill mandating that all votes on the House floor be recorded so a legislator's full voting record can be seen by the public.
 HB 5020 – A bill eliminating legislative abuses in bundling multiple bills together before a law's passage.

Volunteerism and community involvement

Mr. Christmann has over a 30 year record in volunteerism and aid to Lyons, Kansas and the surrounding areas, including (but not limited to):

1. Hospice of Reno County (4 years).

2. Goodfellows of Rice County (4 years).

3. National Multiple Sclerosis Society (9 years).

4. Rice County Coalition for Children and Families (4 years).

5. Kansas Special Olympics (4 years).

6. Pro-bono work as a Kansas Judge (over 14 years).

7. Debate Judge for Sterling High School (3 years).

8. Captain of the Lyons Salt Emergency Medical state-wide Mine Rescue Team (6 years).

9.His Pro-bono work as a Negotiator and President for a Labor Union (over 16 years).

10. As City Councilman of Ward 4, Christmann donated his salary every year to people and agencies in need around Lyons and Rice County (7 years).

11. Former Vice-Chairman of the House Rural Caucus, Representative Christmann used this position to successfully keep Rice County in the Rural Opportunity Zone, which means moving there comes with significant added benefits including a 100% tax credit and student loan forgiveness assistance for helping underdeveloped areas.

Honors and awards
 2022 – Key to the City of Lyons, Kansas, in recognition of “…the countless successful negotiations between governmental agencies and philanthropic contributions to and for the people and citizens of Lyons, Kansas…”, Presented by Mayor Dustin Schultz   
 2017 – The Michael A. Barbara Award, The Kansas Municipal Judges Association
 2016 – A Tribute Award naming Christmann a "State-wide Visionary", by the Kansas State Senate
 2015 – Inducted into Mensa International, (IQ of 155), A high IQ society 
 2014 – Appointment as negotiator to the "2014 Federal Relations Task Force" in Washington D.C, by the Speaker of the Kansas House
 2014 – Appointment as negotiator to the "2014 International Relations Task Force" in Washington D.C, by the Speaker of the Kansas House
 2014 – Champion of the Taxpayer Award, Americans for Prosperity
 2014 – Featured in the Journal Magazine (On Civic Leadership) "The Art of the (Healthy) Deal", the Kansas Leadership Center
 2013 – Legislator of the Year Award, Kansas EMS Association
 1997 – Best Kansas Mine Rescue Team, Kansas State-Wide Mine Rescue Competition, The Kansas Small Mining Association

References 

1976 births
Living people
Republican Party members of the Kansas House of Representatives
Politicians from Portsmouth, Virginia
People from Lyons, Kansas
Harvard Law School alumni
21st-century American politicians
Mensans